Born Yesterday is an album by The Everly Brothers, released in 1985. It peaked at No. 83 on the Billboard 200 and No. 22 on the Top Country Albums charts.

Track listing
"Amanda Ruth" (Chip Kinman, Tony Kinman) 3:17
"I Know Love" (Brian Neary, Jim Photoglo) 2:37
"Born Yesterday" (Don Everly) 4:00
"These Shoes" (Jon Goin, Larry Lee) 3:45
"Arms of Mary" (Iain Sutherland) 2:25
"That Uncertain Feeling" (Steve Gould) 3:11
"Thinkin' 'Bout You" (Billy Burnette, Larry Henley) 2:45
"Why Worry" (Mark Knopfler) 4:45
"Abandoned Love" (Bob Dylan) 4:03
"Don't Say Goodnight" (Brian Neary, Jim Photoglo) 4:37
"Always Drive a Cadillac" (Larry Raspberry) 5:02
"You Send Me" (Sam Cooke) 3:42

Personnel
Don Everly - vocals
Phil Everly - vocals
Albert Lee, Phil Donnelly - guitar
Phil Cranham - bass guitar
Pete Wingfield - keyboards
Larrie Londin - drums
Liam O'Flynn - Irish pipes, tin whistle on "Abandoned Love"

Chart performance

References

1985 albums
The Everly Brothers albums
Albums produced by Dave Edmunds
Mercury Records albums